Jamie Records is a record label founded in Philadelphia, Pennsylvania, in 1956 by Harold Lipsius (1913–2007) and Allan Sussel (1924–2003). Their first 45rpm single, "It's Great to Fall in Love"/"Truly" by Marian Caruso, was issued in 1956. The label was named after Allan Sussel's eldest daughter, Jamie Sussel Turner.

History 
The label became popular in 1958 with the release of Duane Eddy's "Rebel Rouser"/"Stalkin'", which reached No. 6 on the Billboard Hot 100. Eddy became the mainstay Jamie artist, recording hit after hit, including "Because They're Young" (No. 4) and "Forty Miles of Bad Road" (No. 9). Eddy's last Jamie single "Runaway Pony"/"Just Because" was issued in 1962.

The Jordan Brothers, hailing from Frackville, Pennsylvania, also recorded for Jamie. Their first release was "Send Me Your Picture" and their biggest hit, "Gimme Some Lovin'", was released in the US before the more successful version by the Spencer Davis Group. The Jordans toured with Dick Clark's Caravan of Stars bus tour and appeared on Philadelphia and New Jersey-based TV shows.

The last major charting record on Jamie was released in 1966, when the label issued Crispian St. Peters' "The Pied Piper" in the US (No. 4). Afterwards, the hits came out on their subsidiary labels: "Boogaloo Down Broadway" by the Fantastic Johnny C (No. 7 pop and No. 5 R&B, in 1967) and "The Horse" by Cliff Nobles & Co. (No. 2, No. 2 R&B in 1968) on the Phil-L.A. of Soul label; Brenda and the Tabulations' "Dry Your Eyes" (No. 20, No. 8 R&B) on the Dionn label, 1967; and "Love (Can Make You Happy)" by Mercy which reached No. 2 pop in 1969, on the Sundi label.

Subsidiary labels
Arctic
Caldwell
Carney
Charay
Chestnut
Day Dell
DePlace
Dionn
Dome
Dynamo
First Amendment
Frantic
Golden Eagle
Gong Show
Hercules
House of Orange
Important
Jamie Golden Hits (reissue label)
Junior
Lancelot
LA
La Louisianne
Landa
Le Cam
Lyndell
Montel
MSL
Olympia
Palm
Phil-L.A. of Soul
Philomega
The Phoenix
Pic 1
Poogie
Roc-Ker
Romulus
Ru-Jac
Showtime
Silver Dollar
Soft
Spindletop
Stone
Sundi
Swamp Dogg Presents
Talley-Ho
Tear Drop
Terri
Three Speed
Tiris
Thunderball
Top and Bottom
Turn Ray
Uptown
V-Tone
Vent
Wale
William Hart Corporation
Wilson

Roster

 Craig Alden
 Arthur K. Adams
 Rex Allen
 Tony Allen and the Wonders
 Anthony and the Sophomores
 Yvonne Baker
 Chuck Barris (Gong Show Records)
 Barry and the Vikings
 Jesse Belvin
 Billy and the Essentials
 Umberto Bindi
 Warren Bloom & Sea of Galilee Singers
 Neil Brian
 Norman Brooks
 Don Blyer and the Tuesdaynighters
 Bobby Bond
 Bobby Bradshaw
 Brenda & the Tabulations
 Jimmy Briggs
 Joe Brown
 Gerald Calvi Orchestra
 Anita Carter
 Carolyn Carter
 Marian Caruso
 Pierre Cavalli Orchestra
 Savannah Churchill
 Claudine Clark
 Sanford Clark
 Johnny Colmus
 Connie Conway
 Don Costa
 Pal Crawford
 Pee Wee Crayton
 Chuck Crayne
 Ann D'Andrea
 Jack Dailey
 Jim Dale
 Dale & Grace (Montel)
 Glenn Darrell Orchestra and Chorus
 Mac Davis
 Robert Byrd (Bobby Day) and his Birdies
 Alan Dean and His Problems
 Roland Dice
 Johnny Dorelli
 Dorothy and the Hesitations
 Lyn Earlington
 Duane Eddy
 Edge of Darkness
 Emily Evans
 Denny Ezba's Gold
 Raymond Le Fevre Orchestra
 Ernie Fields Orchestra
 Dallas Frazier
 Don Forbes
 Girard Gregory
 Peter Hamilton
 Curly Hamner & the Cooper Brothers
 Lee Hazlewood
 Pervis Herder
 Heroes of Cranberry Farm
 Ben Higgins
 Billy Jean Horton
 Darrell Howe
 Howie
 Pookie Hudson
 Leon Huff
 Jimmy Hughes
 Burt Jackson
 Mark James Trio
 Marke Johnson
 Marvin & Johnny
 Miriam Johnson
 Johnny Angel and the Creations
 Johnny and the High Keys
 Al Jones
 Roosevelt Jones
 Dick Jordan
 Jennie Jordan
 Alexandrow Karazov
 Joey Kay
 Ray Kennedy
 Pepe Lattanzi
 Pat Leahy
 Steve Lee
 Sylvia De Leion
 Tony Liss
 Ricky Livid and the Tone Deafs
 Shorty Long & the Santa Fe Rangers
 Barbara Lynn
 Magic Reign
 Rosalie Mann
 Mae Maria and the Maybees
 Marlena
 Mashmakhan
 Barbara Mason
 Lee Maye (aka Arthur Lee Maye and the Crowns)
 Tommy McLain (MSL)
 Johnny Mendell
 Mercy
 Microbop Ensemble
 Stephen Monahan
 Chris Montez
 Carol Murray
 New Hope
 Cliff Nobles (Phil-LA of Soul)
 Jacky Noguez and His Orchestra
 Cindy Owens
 Pal and the Prophets
 Tony Panassi
 Johnny Pearson Orchestra
 Bobby Peterson
 Bobby Please and the Pleasers
 Jamie Power
 Donna Prima
 Rita Raines
 Denny Randall
 Anita Ray
 Chuck Reed
 Rick and the Keens
 Floyd Robinson
 Mark Robinson
 Wayne Rooks
 Dean Scott
 Ray Sharpe
 Timmy Shaw
 Jon Sisco
 Spilt Milk
 Crispian St. Peters
 Lincoln Starr
 Jerry Stevens
 Gene Summers
 Sunny & The Sunliners (Tear Drop Records)
 Arthur Thomas
 Tommo and the Ding Dongs
 Mitchell Torok
 Titus Turner
 Dick Van Dyke
 Jimmy Velvit (Tear Drop Records)
 Los Vivos
 Bill Wright Sr.
 C.L. Weldon and the Pictures
 Wheel of Fortune
 Marty Wilde and the Wild Cats
 J. Frank Wilson
 Sue Winford
 The Aubrey Twins
 The Ballistics
 The Beatle-ettes
 The Blackwells
 The Chell-Mars
 The Cole Brothers
 The Combo Kings
 The Creations
 The Dantes
 The Dovells
 The Emotional Upsets
 The Fantastic Johnny C (Phil-LA of Soul)
 The Five Chords
 The Four J's
 The Four-Evers
 The Goodlettsville Five
 The Inspirations
 The Intentions
 The Intros
 The Jordan Brothers
 The Key Brothers
 The Kit Kats
 The Legends
 The Lolly-Pops
 The Looters
 The Lords of T.O.N.K.
 The Matadors
 The Mechanics
 The New Breed
 The New Silhouettes
 The Pentagons
 The Ragin' Storms
 The Rainbows
 The Revels
 The Riffs
 The Scamps
 The Sharps
 The Sheiks
 The Sherrys
 The Showstoppers (Showtime)
 The Sonics
 The Statesmen
 The Sundowners
 The Teenmakers
 The Timberland Four
 The Tritones
 The Tygers
 The Velaires
 The Waldron Sisters
 The Wil-Ettes
 Shira

See also 
 List of record labels

References

Notes

Inline citations

External links 
 Official Jamie Records website

Record labels established in 1957
American independent record labels
Rhythm and blues record labels
Rock and roll record labels
IFPI members